Yeast is a monthly peer-reviewed scientific journal published by Wiley-Blackwell. It publishes original research articles, reviews, and short communications on all aspects of Saccharomyces and other clinically important yeasts. The journal focuses on the most significant developments of research with unicellular fungi, including innovative methods of broad applicability. The editors-in-chief are John Armstrong, Dana Davis, Gianni Liti, Steve Oliver. According to the Journal Citation Reports, the journal has a 2011 impact factor of 1.895.

References

External links 
 

Microbiology journals
Wiley-Blackwell academic journals
English-language journals
Publications established in 1985
Monthly journals